West Butterwick is a village and civil parish in North Lincolnshire, England.

The name 'Butterwick' comes from the Old English butere-wick meaning 'butter farm'.

West Butterwick Grade II listed Anglican parish church is dedicated to St Mary. It was built in 1841 of beige brick, with a thin octagonal west tower. A further Grade II listed building is The Old Vicarage, built in 1863 by James Fowler of Louth. An 1824 listed windmill tower is at Mill Farm on North Street.

In 1885 Kelly's Directory recorded a Primitive Methodist and a General Baptist chapel.

Originally a township in Owston parish, West Butterwick  was made an ecclesiastical parish in its own right in 1841.  
 
The 2001 Census found 776 people in 312 households, increasing to a population of 795 in 341 households at the 2011 census.

References

External links

"West Butterwick", Genuki.org.uk. Retrieved 15 August 2011
West Butterwick Parish Council. Retrieved 15 August 2011
"West Butterwick", The Isle of Axholme Family History Society. Retrieved 15 August 2011
"Isle of Axholme", isleofaxholme.net. Retrieved 15 August 2011

Villages in the Borough of North Lincolnshire
Civil parishes in Lincolnshire